Artabrus erythrocephalus is a species of spider in the family Salticidae, found in Singapore and Java.

References

Salticidae
Spiders of Asia
Spiders described in 1846